The Technical Group of Independents was a heterogenous political technical group in the European Parliament operating between 1979 and 1984.

History
The Technical Group of Independents was formed in 1979. The group was officially called "Group for the Technical Coordination and the Defence of Independent Groups and Members" and it used the abbreviation "CDI". It was a coalition of parties ranging from the centre to the radical left, which were not aligned with any of the major international party federations. In 1984 most of the CDI members later joined the "Rainbow Group".

The group was a rather diverse alliance, and this was reflected in its chairs which included the Italian Radical Marco Pannella, the hardline Irish Republican Neil Blaney and Danish left-wing Eurosceptic Jens-Peter Bonde. On 13 December 1983, the group was joined by British MEP Michael Gallagher of the Social Democratic Party, who was previously member of the Labour Party and Socialist Group.

MEPs at 13 December 1983

Sources
Europe Politique
European Parliament MEP Archives
CVCE- Centre Virtuel de la Connaissance sur l'Europe

References

Former European Parliament party groups
Technical parliamentary groups